These are the official results of the Women's 400 metres Hurdles event at the 1993 IAAF World Championships in Stuttgart, Germany. There were a total number of 36 participating athletes, with Five qualifying heats, three semi-finals and the final held on Thursday 1993-08-19.

Final

Semi-finals
Held on Tuesday 1993-08-17

Qualifying heats
Held on Monday 1993-08-16

See also
 1988 Women's Olympic 400m Hurdles (Seoul)
 1990 Women's European Championships 400m Hurdles (Split)
 1992 Women's Olympic 400m Hurdles (Barcelona)
 1994 Women's European Championships 400m Hurdles (Helsinki)

References
 Results

H
400 metres hurdles at the World Athletics Championships
1993 in women's athletics